Monchique is a freguesia (parish) in Monchique Municipality (Algarve, Portugal). The population in 2011 was 4,817, in an area of 159.28 km².

Main sites
 Nossa Senhora do Desterro Convent
 Monchique Church or Nossa Senhora da Conceição Church
 Fóia, highest mountain in Algarve

References

Freguesias of Monchique